Heiberg is both a surname and a given name. Notable people with the name include:

Surname:
Anders Michael Heiberg (1767–1815), Norwegian jurist and politician
Anton Heiberg (1878–1947), Norwegian stage instructor and theatre director
Astrid Nøklebye Heiberg (1936–2020), Norwegian politician
Axel Heiberg (1848–1932), Norwegian diplomat, financier, and patron
Axel Heiberg (judge) (1908–1988), Norwegian judge
Bernt Heiberg (1909–2001), Norwegian architect
Chris Heiberg (born 1985), South African rugby player
 Christen Heiberg (civil servant) (1737–1801), Norwegian civil servant
 Christen Heiberg (physician) (1799–1872), Norwegian surgeon
Edvard Heiberg (1911–2000), Norwegian engineer and railway director
Eivind Heiberg (1870–1939), Norwegian engineer and railway director
Elvin R. Heiberg III (1932– 2013), U.S. army general and engineer
Erik Heiberg (1916–1996), Norwegian sailor and Olympic medalist
Gerhard Heiberg (born 1939), Norwegian industrialist and International Olympic Committee organizer for the 1994 Winter Olympics
Gunnar Heiberg (1857–1929), Norwegian poet, playwright, journalist, and theatre critic
Gustav Adolf Lammers Heiberg (1875–1948), Norwegian barrister and politician
Gustav Heiberg (1856–1935), Norwegian barrister and politician
Hans Heiberg (1904–1978), Norwegian journalist, critic, essayist, novelist, and playwright
Hjalmar Heiberg (1837–1897), Norwegian physician and anatomist
Inge Heiberg (1861–1920), Norwegian physician and Belgian Congo official
Jacob Vilhelm Rode Heiberg (1860–1946), Danish politician
Jean Heiberg (1884–1976), Norwegian artist and professor
Johan Ludvig Heiberg (historian) (1854–1928), Danish philologist and historian
Johan Ludvig Heiberg (poet) (1791–1860), Danish poet and critic
Johanne Luise Heiberg (1812–1890), Danish actress
Kirsten Heiberg (1907–1976), Norwegian actress and singer
Marianne Heiberg (1945–2004), Norwegian social scientist, economist, and UN official
Peter Andreas Heiberg (1758–1841), Danish author and philologist
Sverre Heiberg (1912–1991), Norwegian photographer
Svend O. Heiberg (1900–1965), Danish-American forester
Thomasine Heiberg (1773–1856), Danish author (see: Thomasine Christine Gyllembourg-Ehrensvärd)

Given name:
Axel Heiberg Stang (1904–1974), Norwegian landowner and forester
Johan Widing Heiberg Landmark (1802–1878), Norwegian jurist and politician
Margrete Heiberg Bose (1866–1952), Argentine physicist of Danish origin

See also
Heiberg, Minnesota, a community in the United States
Heiberg Formation, geological formation in Northwest Territories, Canada
Axel Heiberg Glacier, valley glacier, 48 km long, in the Queen Maud Mountains, Antarctica
Axel Heiberg Island, island in the Qikiqtaaluk Region, Nunavut, Canada
Heiberg Islands, group of four small islands north of Siberia
Heberg
Heideberg (disambiguation)
Heilsberg (disambiguation)
Heimberg (disambiguation)
Heinsberg